The 2016 Football Queensland season was the fourth season since NPL Queensland commenced as the top tier of Queensland men’s football. Below NPL Queensland is a regional structure of ten zones with their own leagues. The strongest of the zones is Football Brisbane with its senior men’s competition consisting of five divisions.

The NPL Queensland premiers qualified for the National Premier Leagues finals series, competing with the other state federation champions in a final knockout tournament to decide the National Premier Leagues Champion for 2016.

Men's League Tables

2016 National Premier League Queensland

The National Premier League Queensland 2016 season was played over 22 matches, with the regular season concluding on 21 August, semi-finals on 27 August, and the Grand Final on 3 September.

Finals

2016 Brisbane Premier League

The 2016 Brisbane Premier League was the 34th edition of the Brisbane Premier League which has been a second level domestic association football competition in Queensland since the Queensland State League was formed in 2008. After 22 rounds, the Promotion and Relegation system was based on the Club Championship, and included points from First Grade, Reserve Grade, U18 and U16 teams.

Finals

2016 Capital League 1

The 2016 Capital League 1 season was the fourth edition of the Capital League 1 as the third level domestic football competition in Queensland. 12 teams competed, all playing each other twice for a total of 22 matches.

Finals

2016 Capital League 2

The 2016 Capital League 2 season was the fourth edition of the Capital League 2 as the fourth level domestic football competition in Queensland. 12 teams competed, all playing each other twice for a total of 22 matches.

Finals

2016 Capital League 3

The 2016 Capital League 3 season was the fourth edition of the Capital League 3 as the fifth level domestic football competition in Queensland. 12 teams competed, all playing each other twice for a total of 22 matches.

Finals

2016 Capital League 4

The 2016 Capital League 4 season was the fourth edition of the Capital League 4 as the sixth level domestic football competition in Queensland. 13 teams competed, all playing each other twice for a total of 24 matches.

Finals

Women's League Tables

2016 Women's NPL Queensland

The 2016 Women's NPL Queensland season was the second edition of the Women's NPL Queensland as the top level domestic football of women's competition in Queensland. 11 teams competed, all playing each other twice for a total of 20 matches, with the regular season concluding on 22 August, semi-finals on 28 August, and the Grand Final on 4 September.

Finals

Cup Competitions

2016 Canale Travel Cup

Brisbane-based soccer clubs competed in 2016 for the Canale Cup. Clubs entered from the Brisbane Premier League, the Capital League 1, Capital League 2 and Capital League 3. The early rounds of the competition were also linked to the qualifying competition for the 2016 FFA Cup, where the 10 Brisbane-based winners from the Fourth round qualified to the fifth round of the Canale Cup competition.

This knockout competition was won by Mitchelton FC.

FFA Cup Qualifiers

Queensland-based soccer clubs competed in 2016 in the preliminary rounds for the 2016 FFA Cup. The four winners of Seventh Round qualified for the final rounds of the FFA Cup; Far North Queensland FC (representing North Queensland), Surfers Paradise Apollo (representing South Queensland), with Brisbane Strikers and Redlands United representing Brisbane. In addition, A-League club Brisbane Roar qualified for the final rounds, entering at the Round of 32.

References

2016 in Australian soccer
Football Queensland seasons